Ann McCrea (born February 25, 1931) is an American film and television actress. She is known for playing Midge Kelsey in the American sitcom television series The Donna Reed Show.

Life and career 
McCrea was born in DuBois, Pennsylvania to a Greek mother and Scottish father. At an early age, she decided that she wanted to become an actress after seeing stage plays in New York. McCrea attended a modeling school, and became a cover girl and model. She met Bing Crosby, who encouraged her to move to Hollywood, California. McCrea was in Hollywood, California for five years.

Mccrea began her acting career in 1952, appearing in the film Deadline – U.S.A. playing the uncredited role of "Sally Gardner". She also guest-starred in television programs including Bachelor Father, Mr. Lucky, The Deputy, Johnny Midnight, Tales of Wells Fargo, Rawhide, Perry Mason, McHale's Navy, The Bob Cummings Show, Family Affair and Wendy and Me. McCrea appeared in films such as Will Success Spoil Rock Hunter?, About Mrs. Leslie, Sweethearts on Parade, Welcome to Hard Times, The War Wagon, I Married a Woman, China Doll, Pardners, Singin' in the Rain and The Ladies Man.

In 1963, McCrea played Midge Kelsey, the next-door neighbour of the title character, in the American sitcom television series The Donna Reed Show.

Filmography

References

External links 

Rotten Tomatoes profile

1931 births
Living people
People from DuBois, Pennsylvania
Actresses from Pennsylvania
American people of Greek descent
American people of Scottish descent
American film actresses
American television actresses
20th-century American actresses
American models
21st-century American women